Ornithopus sativus, the serradella or common birdsfoot, is a species of flowering plant in the family Fabaceae. It is native to Southwestern Europe and Northwest Africa in Portugal, western Spain, northern Morocco and Algeria, and southwestern France and has been introduced as a legume forage to many locations around the world, including most of central and eastern Europe, Turkey, the Caucasus, the Azores, South Africa, Kenya, Java, most of Australia, the North Island of New Zealand, southern Chile, and California. It is known for producing a highquality forage in highly acidic, nutrientpoor soils.

Subtaxa
The following subtaxa are accepted:
Ornithopus sativus nothosubsp. macrorrhynchus (Willk.) Talavera, Arista & P.L.Ortiz
Ornithopus sativus subsp. sativus

References

Loteae
Forages
Flora of Portugal
Flora of Spain
Flora of France
Flora of the Azores
Flora of Madeira
Flora of Morocco
Flora of Algeria
Plants described in 1804